A zinc oxide nanorod sensor or ZnO nanorod sensor is an electronic or optical device detecting presence of certain gas or liquid molecules (e.g. humidity, NO, hydrogen, etc.) in the ambient atmosphere. The sensor exploits enhanced surface area (and thus surface activity) intrinsic to all nano-sized materials, including ZnO nanorods. Adsorption of molecules on the nanorods can be detected through variation of the nanorods' properties, such as photoluminescence, electrical conductivity, vibration frequency, mass, etc. The simplest and thus most popular way is to pass electrical current through the nanorods and observe its changes upon exposure to gas.
Synthesis can be obtained by a hydrothermal method using 1:1 Molar solution of hexamine and Zinc nitrate solution kept together for 56 hours in an autoclave at 60-70 degree Celsius.

See also
Hydrogen safety
List of sensors
Nanoelectromechanical systems

References

Reviews
 J. G. Lu et al. "Quasi-one-dimensional metal oxide materials—Synthesis, properties and applications" (42 pages) Mater. Sci. Eng. R 52 (2006) 49
 S.J. Pearton et al. "ZnO-based nanowires" Nano 4 (2007) 201
 W. Park et al. "Catalyst-free growth of ZnO nanorods and their nanodevice applications" Int. J. Nanotechnology 3 (2006) 372

External links
For the future hydrogen economy, a tiny, self-powered sensor

Gas sensors
Nanoelectronics